Amalie Münster (October 31, 1767 – September 3, 1814) was a Danish courtier, translator and poet.

Biography
Amalie Isabella Johanne Charlotte Münster  was a leading culture personality at the  Danish Royal court. She was educated at Grolland in Bremen. In 1787, she married Councilor Georg Werner August Ditrich (1751–1801). When her husband died in 1801, Amalie Münster continued to live in Vienna before moving to Kiel and later to Copenhagen. She was the lady in waiting of Princess Juliane Sophie of Denmark 1805-09 and then of Princess Caroline of Denmark. She was an acquaintance of  Danish poets Jens Baggesen and Adam Oehlenschläger, whose poems she translated. She published her own poems, «Amaliens poetische Versuche» (1796). Amalie Münster died at Frederiksberg Palace in 1814,.

References

Other sources
 Dansk biografisk Lexikon / XII. Bind. Münch - Peirup

1767 births
1814 deaths
Danish nobility
Danish women poets
Danish ladies-in-waiting
18th-century Danish translators
19th-century Danish translators
19th-century Danish poets
18th-century Danish women writers
18th-century Danish poets
19th-century Danish women writers